Kojšov is a village and municipality in the Gelnica District in the Košice Region of eastern Slovakia. In 2011 had total municipality a population of 736 inhabitants. Near Kojšov are located natural sightseeings Kojšovská Hoľa /hill/ and Folkmarská Skala /stone sculpture/, as well as Lukáčova Jaskyňa/cave/. The village and the surroundings has many holiday homes where people from Košice go at the weekends and relax.

Geography
Kojšov is located west from Košice in a hilly area; total height above sea level varies from 425 to 614 meters.

History
The main occupation of the locals was the forest industry and sawmills.

Notable persons
Juraj Jakubisko, film director

See also
 List of municipalities and towns in Slovakia

References

Further reading 
 Genealogical resources
The records for genealogical research are available at the state archive "Statny Archiv in Kosice, Levoca, Slovakia"

 Roman Catholic church records (births/marriages/deaths): 1716–1950 (parish AB)
 Greek Catholic church records (births/marriages/deaths): 1727–1896 (parish A)
 Lutheran church records (births/marriages/deaths): 1783–1896 (parish B)

External links
 http://en.e-obce.sk/obec/kojsov/kojsov.html
 Official homepage
 Surnames of living people in Kojsov

Villages and municipalities in Gelnica District